Stirgay Sre Na Manum (English; Red Eyes Not Acceptable) is a 2017's Pashto Action film mady by Arshad Khan and Shahid Khan and Mehak Noor in the lead role. It was released on 14 April 2017.

References 
           

Pashto-language films
2017 films
2017 action films